Ailanthone is an allelopathic chemical that is produced by the Ailanthus altissima tree which inhibits the growth of other plants.

References

Allelopathic substances
Antimalarial agents
Diterpenes
Delta-lactones